Mycolicibacter engbaekii (formerly Mycobacterium engbaekii) is a species of bacteria from the phylum Actinomycetota. It is susceptible to amikacin, clarithromycin, ethambutol, linezolid, and rifabutin. It has also been recovered from African tuberculosis patients, water treatment plant sludge, and dairy cattle.

References

Acid-fast bacilli
engbaekii
Bacteria described in 2013